Shikhikent is a rural locality (a selo) and the administrative centre of Shikhikentsky Selsoviet, Suleyman-Stalsky District, Republic of Dagestan, Russia. The population was 964 as of 2010. There are 3 streets.

Geography 
Shikhikent is located 11 km south of Kasumkent (the district's administrative centre) by road. Butkent is the nearest rural locality.

References 

Rural localities in Suleyman-Stalsky District